Larkhall Thistle Football Club is a football club from Larkhall, in South Lanarkshire, Scotland. The team plays in red and white stripes and its home ground since 1881 has been Gasworks Park.

Staff

Committee members

Players

First team squad

Management team

Sponsors 
Larkhall Thistle's main shirt sponsor for the 2022-23 season is L4 Teamwear.

Notable players

"The Jags" are credited with having the most players to step up be capped by the Scotland senior team, one for the Ireland national football team and one for the United States. Thirteen ex-players have been capped by Scotland and five have gone on to captain their country. Scotland captains in bold.
Paddy McConnell - Ireland national football team, Bradford City, Doncaster Rovers, Southport, Shelbourne, Boston United, Hibernian
Gerry Baker - St Mirren, Hibernian, Ipswich Town, United States
Billy Boyd - Clyde
Tommy Cairns - Rangers
Jimmy Carabine - Third Lanark
John Clark - Celtic
Jock Ewart - Bradford City
Tommy Ewing - Partick Thistle
Jimmy Gibson - Partick Thistle, Aston Villa
Neilly Gibson - Rangers, Partick Thistle
Jock Govan - Hibernian 
John Hutton - Aberdeen, Blackburn Rovers
Andy McLaren - Preston North End
Willie McStay - Celtic
Alex Raisbeck - Liverpool
Hugh Burns - Rangers, Kilmarnock

Honours
Scottish Junior Cup
Winners: 1907–08, 1913–14
Runners-up: 1902–03
Semi-finalists: 1931–32, 1967–68

West of Scotland Cup
Runners-up: 1989–90

West Central First Division
Runners-up: 2001–02, 2016–17 (promoted)

West Central Second Division
Winners: 1999–2000

Lanarkshire Junior League
Champions: 1895–96, 1912–13, 1913–14, 1930–31, 1947–48, 1951–52

Lanarkshire Cup
Winners: 1907–08, 1909–10, 1936–37, 1950–51, 1955–56

Lanarkshire League Cup
Winners: 1932–33, 1935–36, 1938–39, 1952–53, 1956–57, 1959–60

Lanarkshire Central Cup
Winners: 1944–45, 1945–46, 1947–48

Evening Times Trophy
Runners-up: 1974–75, 2002–03

Central League Cup
Runners-up: 2002–03

References

External links 
 Club website
 Scottish Football Historical Archive

Association football clubs established in 1878
Football clubs in Scotland
Scottish Junior Football Association clubs
Football in South Lanarkshire
1878 establishments in Scotland
Larkhall
West of Scotland Football League teams
Larkhall Thistle F.C.